Lippy Lou (born Louise Neale; 12 July 1975) is a British recording artist who had a brief recording career in the mid-1990s.

Career
In 1995, Lippy Lou released two singles, "Liberation" and "Freaks", on Boy George's More Protein label.  Both singles were produced by Mike Koglin, and entered the UK top 100 singles chart.

"Liberation" was described by Billboard as a "coming out anthem." The chorus of "Freaks" was based on the Was (Not Was) song "Out Come the Freaks".  Although Lippy Lou made further recordings, an album was not released.

Discography

Singles

References

1975 births
Living people
English LGBT musicians
Lesbian musicians
21st-century English women musicians